Frank Ordenewitz (born 25 March 1965) is a German former professional footballer who played as a forward.

Club career 
Ordenewitz scored 68 goals in 272 Bundesliga matches.

In a league match against 1. FC Köln on 7 May 1988 the Werder Bremen player admitted to a handball in the penalty area to the referee. Köln went on to win the match 2–0. For his sportsmanship he won the FIFA Fair Play Award that season.

Three seasons later, now playing for 1. FC Köln, Ordenewitz received a yellow card against MSV Duisburg in the DFB-Pokal semi-final on 6 May 1991 (final score: 3–0 for Köln). That would have blocked him from playing in the final against his former club, Werder Bremen, and so his coach, Erich Rutemöller, advised him to get himself sent off, since this would allow him to instead serve his suspension in their next Bundesliga game. As asked, Ordenewitz intentionally knocked the ball away and was sent off. In an interview after the game, Rutemöller admitted the plan, saying: "Otze came to me, and I think you shouldn't take the chance away from him, and so I said: 'Do it!'". This request, in various modifications, later became the dictum “Mach et, Otze!”. In response, the DFB changed the rule and banned Ordenewitz from playing in the final anyway, which FC Köln went on to lose on penalties.

International career 
Ordenewitz was capped twice for the West Germany national team in 1987.

Career statistics

Club

International

Honors
Werder Bremen
 Bundesliga: 1987–88
 DFL-Supercup: 1988

Individual
 J-League Top Scorer: 1994 (30 goals)
 1988 FIFA Fair Play Award

References

External links
 
 
 
 

1965 births
Living people
People from Heidekreis
Footballers from Lower Saxony
Association football forwards
German footballers
Germany international footballers
Germany under-21 international footballers
Bundesliga players
J1 League players
Japan Football League (1992–1998) players
SV Werder Bremen players
SV Werder Bremen II players
1. FC Köln players
JEF United Chiba players
Hamburger SV players
Vegalta Sendai players
VfB Oldenburg players
German expatriate footballers
German expatriate sportspeople in Japan
Expatriate footballers in Japan